Wayne Alan Wilcox (born December 11, 1978) is an American actor and singer who is best known for his role of Marty on the TV show Gilmore Girls and his appearance in the film version of the musical Rent as Gordon, a member of Angel and Tom's AIDS support group. He played the character and sang vocals for the songs Will I and Life Support on disc I of the soundtrack for the film.

Early life and education
Wayne was born in Knoxville, Tennessee. He is a graduate of Boston University.

Career
He played recurring character Marty on ten episodes of Gilmore Girls over the fourth, fifth, and seventh seasons after being discovered by Gilmore Girls co-creators Amy Sherman-Palladino and Dan Palladino while working as a waiter at Mercer Kitchen in SoHo, Manhattan.

Wilcox has also appeared in the Goodman Theater production of Elizabeth Spencer's novella The Light in the Piazza as Fabrizio alongside Celia Keenan-Bolger as Clara, and in the off-Broadway production of The Great American Trailer Park Musical in 2005 as Leo/Duke. In 2006, he was performing in the Roundabout Theatre Companies off-Broadway adaption of Suddenly Last Summer, a Tennessee Williams play, as George Holly; Carla Gugino and Blythe Danner also acted in the project.

He has a small role in the movie Interview with Steve Buscemi and Sienna Miller, which had its U.S. premiere at the 2007 Sundance Film Festival. Wayne also played Adult Alexander Ashbrook in Coram Boy, a Broadway version of the successful 2006 National Theater of London production, which opened May 2007.

In 2011, Wilcox appeared in The Normal Heart. Before moving to Broadway, film, and television, he was a part of Tim Hanes' Kids Unlimited in Knoxville.

Wilcox portrayed Sydney Chaplin in Chaplin in 2012. From April to June 2015, he acted in the premier of Paul Gordon's Sense and Sensibility at Chicago Shakespeare Theatre, originating the role of Edward Ferrars.

In 2018, Wilcox played the character of Ray in a web series, Only Children, for which he was nominated for Best Lead Actor – Drama at the 2019 Indie Series Awards.

Filmography

Film

Television

References

External links
 
 Wayne Alan Wilcox facebook

1978 births
American male film actors
American male musical theatre actors
Living people